Gambler First Nation (GFN,  meaning gambling man place) is an Ojibway First Nations community in Manitoba. With a population of 334 members, it is one of the smallest indigenous communities in Manitoba.

Its main reserve, Gambler 63, is located at Binscarth, Manitoba, Canada.

Reserve lands
The band has two reserve:
Gambler First Nation 63B — has a total size of 

References

West Region Tribal Council
First Nations governments in Manitoba
 
First Nations in Southern Manitoba